Polish civil war may refer to: 

 Pagan reaction in Poland (1030s)
 12th-15th centuries: numerous small conflicts of the time of fragmentation of Poland, particularly in the Duchies of Silesia
 Chicken War (1537)
 First War of the Polish Succession (1587–1588)
 late 16th - mid 17th century: various Cossack uprisings
 Zebrzydowski Rebellion (1606–08)
 Lubomirski's Rokosz (1665–66)
 Civil war in the Grand Duchy of Lithuania (1700, part of the Polish-Lithuanian Commonwealth)
 Civil war in Poland (1704–06)
 Tarnogród Confederation (1715–1716)
 Second War of the Polish Succession (1733–1738)
 Bar Confederation (1768–1772)
 Targowica Confederation (1792)
 May coup d'état (1926)
 Lesko uprising (1932)
 Polish anti-communist resistance (1945-1950s)
 History of Solidarity (1980-1989)

Civil wars involving the states and peoples of Europe
Civil wars